Jose Gallegos (born September 22, 2001) is an American professional soccer player who plays as an attacking midfielder for Danish Superliga club SønderjyskE.

Club career
On April 25, 2019, Gallegos signed with USL Championship side San Antonio FC after spending time in their academy setup.

In 2020 was a finalist for the USL Championship Young Player of the Year award. In March 2021 Gallegos spent two weeks training with Bayern Munich.

On January 27, 2022, Gallegos was transferred to Danish Superliga side SønderjyskE on a deal until 2026.

International career
Born in the United States to Mexican parents, Gallegos holds United States and Mexican citizenship, making him eligible to represent either the United States or Mexico.

Career statistics

Club

Notes

References

2001 births
Living people
American soccer players
American expatriate soccer players
Association football midfielders
San Antonio FC players
Soccer players from San Antonio
USL Championship players
SønderjyskE Fodbold players
American expatriate sportspeople in Denmark
Expatriate men's footballers in Denmark